Kudafinolhu as a place name may refer to:
 Kudafinolhu (Haa Alif Atoll) (Republic of Maldives)
 Kudafinolhu (Kaafu Atoll) (Republic of Maldives)